Kadji Sport Academies is a sports academy and association football team from Békoko, Douala in Cameroon. The academy was founded by Gilbert Kadji. Striker  Samuel Eto'o played for the club at youth, and has since gone on to represent Cameroon national football team.

External links
Official website

Football clubs in Cameroon
Football academies in Africa